Advancement Unification Party or AUP formerly known as Liberty Forward Party was a conservative political party in South Korea. This party was created by Lee Hoi Chang, the presidential candidate who lost 2007 presidential elections. On 12 February 2008, the party merged with the People First Party, which got 18 seats in the 2008 Parliamentary election, making it the third-largest party in the National Assembly.
The party was absorbed by Saenuri Party on 16 November 2012.

Human rights activism
In February–March 2012, just before the scheduled national elections, Liberty Forward Party representative Park Sun-young became active in the "Save My Friend" campaign, a series of protests protesting China's policy of forcibly repatriating North Korean refugees; she went on hunger strike in front of the Chinese embassy in Seoul and was hospitalized after fainting; once she recovered she resumed her efforts to raise awareness about North Korean human rights issues. In April, during a speech at an event hosted by the Korean-American Freedom League, Park criticized the Catholic Association for Peace and Justice, questioning its silence on the plight of North Korean refugees and arguing that the Left's anti-Americanism was distracting from much more serious issues: "Defectors) are ruthlessly being killed, so how can you remain completely silent? In the Republic of Korea, there is a wildfire anti-American movement, but they never make a single critical statement against China."

2012 election

In the 2012 National Assembly election the party lost all but five of its 18 seats, declining to the fourth position, well behind the left-leaning Unified Progressive Party (which gained seats). Party leader Sim Dae-pyung announced his resignation after the party's poor performance.

Electoral results

References

External links

Official web site

2008 establishments in South Korea
2012 disestablishments in South Korea
Conservative parties in South Korea
Defunct political parties in South Korea
Liberty Korea Party
Political parties disestablished in 2012
Political parties established in 2008